The ECHL (formerly the East Coast Hockey League) is a mid-level professional ice hockey league based in Shrewsbury, New Jersey, with teams scattered across the United States and Canada. It is a tier below the American Hockey League (AHL).

The ECHL and the AHL are the only minor leagues recognized by the collective bargaining agreement between the National Hockey League (NHL) and the National Hockey League Players' Association, meaning any player signed to an entry-level NHL contract and designated for assignment must report to a club in either the ECHL or the AHL. Additionally, the league's players are represented by the Professional Hockey Players' Association in negotiations with the ECHL itself. At least 662 players have played at least one game in the NHL after appearing in the ECHL.

For the 2022–23 season, 28 of the 32 NHL teams have affiliations with an ECHL team with only the Nashville Predators, St. Louis Blues, Vancouver Canucks, and Winnipeg Jets having no official ECHL affiliations. The offseason typically has many affiliation changes between NHL and ECHL teams. NHL teams do sometimes lend contracted players to ECHL teams with whom they have no affiliation agreements for development and increased playing time.

The league's regular season typically begins in October and ends in April, followed by the Kelly Cup playoffs. The most recent playoff champions are the Florida Everblades in 2022.

History
The league, which combined teams from the defunct Atlantic Coast Hockey League and All-American Hockey League, began to play as the East Coast Hockey League in 1988 with five teams— the (Winston-Salem, North) Carolina Thunderbirds (now the Wheeling Nailers); the Erie Panthers (folded in 2011 as the Victoria Salmon Kings); the Johnstown Chiefs (now the Greenville Swamp Rabbits); the Knoxville Cherokees (ceased operations as the Pee Dee Pride in 2005; folded in 2009 following failed relocation efforts); and the Virginia Lancers (now the Utah Grizzlies).

In 2003, the West Coast Hockey League ceased operations, and the ECHL board of governors approved membership applications from the Anchorage/Alaska Aces, the Bakersfield Condors, the Fresno Falcons, the Idaho Steelheads, the Las Vegas Wranglers, the Long Beach Ice Dogs and the San Diego Gulls as well as from potential teams in Ontario, California, and Reno, Nevada. Alaska, Bakersfield, Fresno, Idaho, Las Vegas, Long Beach and San Diego began play in the 2003–04 season as expansion teams. In a change reflective of the league's now-nationwide presence, the East Coast Hockey League shortened its name to the orphan initialism ECHL on May 19, 2003. The ECHL reached its largest size to date (31 teams) that season before being reduced to 28 teams for the 2004–05 season.

The ECHL has attempted to be more tech-friendly to its fans. Some improvements on the league's website have included a new schedule and statistics engine powered by League Stat, Inc. (introduced in 2006), internet radio coverage for most teams, and pay-per view broadcasting of ECHL games through B2 Networks (a subsidiary of America One Broadcasting).  In 2008, the league introduced the ECHL toolbar for internet browsers which gave users short cut access to statistics, scores, transactions, and news updates.

At the annual ECHL Board of Governors meeting on June 15, 2010, in Henderson, Nevada, the Board of Governors approved changes to the names of the conferences and divisions. The former American Conference (comprising eleven East Coast and Midwest teams) was renamed the Eastern Conference, while the National Conference (consisting of 8 West Coast teams, including the league's only Canadian team at the time) was re-designated the Western Conference. Within the Eastern Conference, the East Division was renamed the Atlantic Division, and the Western Conference's former West Division was dubbed the Mountain Division.

The league lost its only Canadian team with the folding of the Victoria Salmon Kings subsequent to the 2010–11 season, but increased to 20 teams for the 2011–12 season with the addition of the expansion franchise Chicago Express and the Colorado Eagles who previously played in the Central Hockey League.

With the folding of the Chicago Express at the conclusion of the 2011–12 season and the announcement of expansion franchises in Orlando, San Francisco, Evansville, and Fort Wayne (both in Indiana and both from the Central Hockey League) the league played the 2012–13 season with 23 teams. That number dropped to 22 for the 2013–14 season with the folding of the Trenton Titans and subsequently fell to 21 with the mid-season folding of the San Francisco Bulls on January 27, 2014.

On October 7, 2014, the ECHL announced that the seven remaining active members of the Central Hockey League (the Allen Americans, Brampton Beast, Quad City Mallards, Missouri Mavericks, Rapid City Rush, Tulsa Oilers and Wichita Thunder) would be admitted as new members for the 2014–15 season. The addition of the former CHL teams plus the expansion Indy Fuel raised the number of teams to 28 and placed a team in Canada for the first time since 2011.

Before the 2015–16 season, the AHL's creation of a Pacific Division led the three California ECHL teams to relocate to former AHL cities with the Bakersfield Condors, Ontario Reign, and Stockton Thunder relocating to become the Norfolk Admirals, Manchester Monarchs, and Adirondack Thunder, respectively. By the 2018–19 season, the ECHL had also expanded into other markets recently vacated by the AHL in the Maine Mariners, Newfoundland Growlers, and Worcester Railers.

Teams

2022–23 teams
Alignment, affiliations, and locations for the 2022–23 season.

 Notes

 An asterisk (*) denotes a franchise move. See the respective team articles for more information.

Future teams

Representatives from all potential expansion franchises, markets that have been granted expansion franchises and franchises that have suspended operations must attend the league's annual Board of Governors Meeting between seasons and provide progress reports on their situations in order to keep their ECHL franchise rights. For dormant and existing franchises, the Board of Governors votes whether or not to extend a franchise's league license until the next Board of Governors Meeting.

At the 2012 Board of Governors Meeting, the Board elected to limit the league to 26 teams, with an emphasis on adding teams to the Western Conference.  However, it was decided at the 2015 Board of Governors meeting that the cap should be expanded to 30 teams, hoping to eventually match the NHL and AHL's (then) 30-team totals.

Defunct and relocated teams

Since starting with five franchises in its inaugural season, the ECHL has had dozens of franchises join and leave the league. Typically, these teams fold or relocate due to operation issues or financial losses. The Johnstown Chiefs became the last remaining founding franchise of the East Coast Hockey League to remain in its original city until it relocated to Greenville, South Carolina, following the completion of the 2009–10 season.

While the ECHL has stated in recent years they would not grant voluntary suspensions of franchises for more than one year, both the Toledo Storm (now the Toledo Walleye) and Mississippi Sea Wolves (now defunct) were granted two-year suspensions—the Sea Wolves because of Hurricane Katrina and the Storm in order to demolish their present arena and construct a new one in downtown Toledo. The Mississippi Sea Wolves resumed play for the 2007–08 season, while the Toledo Walleye resumed play in their new arena for the 2009–10 season.

Seven former ECHL franchises have been directly replaced in their respective markets by American Hockey League franchises.  The Greensboro Monarchs were the first, being replaced by the Carolina Monarchs in 1995.  The Hampton Roads Admirals were the second, giving way to the Norfolk Admirals in 2000. The Peoria Rivermen were the third.  In their case, the replacement franchise retained the Worcester IceCats history but assumed the Rivermen identity for their first AHL season of 2005–06. The Charlotte Checkers were the fourth, yielding to a franchise that retained the Albany River Rats history following the club's move to Charlotte following the 2009–10 season and assumed the Checkers identity.  In each of these cases, the ECHL franchise was relinquished to the league by its respective ownership group. In 2015, the three California franchises (Bakersfield Condors, Ontario Reign, and Stockton Thunder) were displaced by the formation of an AHL Pacific Division. Each ECHL franchise involved in the territorial shift was either owned or purchased by their NHL affiliate prior to being relocated.

Alaska Aces (2003–2017; purchased and relocated to Portland, Maine, for the 2018–19 season.)
Arkansas RiverBlades (1999–2003)
Atlantic City Boardwalk Bullies (2001–2005; moved to Stockton, California.)
Augusta Lynx (1998–2008; suspended operations and relinquished their membership back to the ECHL after their ownership group was unable to continue to operate in 2008–09. The first ECHL team to fold in mid-season.)
Bakersfield Condors (2003–15; the team moved to Norfolk, Virginia, to become the Norfolk Admirals and was replaced in the market by an AHL team of the same name.)
Baton Rouge Kingfish (1996–2003; moved to Victoria, British Columbia, as the Victoria Salmon Kings.)
Birmingham Bulls (1992–2001; moved to Atlantic City, New Jersey; now the Adirondack Thunder.)
Brampton Beast (2014–2020; folded during the COVID-19 pandemic.)
Carolina/Winston-Salem Thunderbirds (1988–1992; moved to Wheeling, West Virginia, as the Wheeling Thunderbirds before being renamed as the Wheeling Nailers.)
Charlotte Checkers (1993–2010; replaced by the Charlotte Checkers of the AHL.)
Chesapeake Icebreakers (1997–1999; moved to Jackson, Mississippi.)
Chicago Express (2011–2012; membership relinquished to ECHL.)
Colorado Eagles (2011–2018; organization obtained an expansion franchise in the AHL.)
Columbia Inferno (2001–2008; voluntarily suspended operations.)
Columbus Chill (1991–1999; suspended operations due to the then-impending entry of the Columbus Blue Jackets into the NHL; franchise purchased and relocated to Reading, Pennsylvania.)
Columbus Cottonmouths (2001–2004; the team moved down to what is now the Southern Professional Hockey League; ECHL franchise moved to Bradenton-Sarasota, Florida, to play as Gulf Coast Swords, franchise revoked in summer 2006 after construction halted on the proposed home arena.)
Dayton Bombers (1991–2009; relinquished their membership back to ECHL.)
Elmira Jackals (2007–2017)
Erie Panthers (1988–1996; moved to Baton Rouge, Louisiana.)
Evansville IceMen (2012–2016; moved to Jacksonville, Florida, after a one-year hiatus.)
Fresno Falcons (2003–2008; suspended operations and relinquished their membership back to the ECHL after their ownership group was unable to continue to operate in 2008–09. The second ECHL team to fold in mid-season.)
Greensboro Generals (1999–2004)
Greensboro Monarchs (1989–1995; replaced by the Carolina Monarchs of the AHL.)
Greenville Grrrowl (1998–2006)
Hampton Roads Admirals (1989–2000; replaced by the Norfolk Admirals of the AHL; ECHL franchise purchased in 2001 and moved to Columbus, Georgia, to become the Cottonmouths.)
Huntington Blizzard (1993–2000; moved to Beaumont, Texas, to become the Texas Wildcatters.)
Huntsville Blast (1993–1994; moved to Tallahassee, Florida.)
Jackson Bandits (1999–2003)
Jacksonville Lizard Kings (1995–2000)

Johnstown Chiefs (1988–2010; relocated to Greenville, South Carolina, as the Greenville Road Warriors.)
Knoxville Cherokees (1988–1997; moved to Florence, South Carolina, as the Pee Dee Pride.)
Las Vegas Wranglers (2003–2014; suspended operations for the 2014–15 season and later relinquished their membership.)
Lexington Men O' War (2002–2003; moved to West Valley City, Utah, to become the Utah Grizzlies)
Long Beach Ice Dogs (2003–2007)
Louisiana IceGators (1995–2005)
Louisville IceHawks (1990–1994; moved to Jacksonville, Florida.)
Louisville RiverFrogs (1995–1998; moved to Miami, Florida.)
Macon Whoopee (2001–2002; moved to Lexington, Kentucky, to become the Lexington Men O' War.)
Manchester Monarchs (2015–2019)
Miami Matadors (1998–1999; moved to Cincinnati, Ohio.)
Mississippi Sea Wolves (1996–2009; replaced in the market by the Mississippi Surge of the SPHL.)
Mobile Mysticks (1995–2002; moved to Duluth, Georgia.)
Nashville Knights (1989–1996; moved to Pensacola, Florida.)
New Orleans Brass (1997–2002; team relinquished their league membership after the arrival of the NBA's New Orleans Hornets.)
Ontario Reign (2008–2015; the team moved to Manchester, New Hampshire, to become the Manchester Monarchs.)
Pee Dee Pride (1997–2005; suspended operations after the 2004–05 season and planned to move to the Myrtle Beach area but later relinquished their membership.)
Pensacola Ice Pilots (1996–2008; replaced in the market by the Ice Flyers of the SPHL.) 
Peoria Rivermen (1996–2005; replaced by the Peoria Rivermen of the AHL.)
Phoenix RoadRunners (2005–2009)
Quad City Mallards (2014–2018)
Raleigh IceCaps (1991–1998; moved to Augusta, Georgia.)
Richmond Renegades (1990–2003)
Roanoke Express (1993–2004)
San Diego Gulls (2003–2006)
San Francisco Bulls (2012–2014; ceased operations and relinquished their membership back to the ECHL after their ownership group was unable to continue to operate in 2013–14. The third ECHL team to fold in mid-season.)
Stockton Thunder (2005–2015; team moved to Glens Falls, New York, to become the Adirondack Thunder.)
Tallahassee Tiger Sharks (1994–2001; moved to Macon, Georgia.)
Texas Wildcatters (2003–2008; moved to Ontario, California.)
Trenton Titans (1999–2013)
Victoria Salmon Kings (2004–2011; replaced in market by the WHL's Victoria Royals.)
Virginia Lancers/Roanoke Valley Rebels/Rampage (1988–1993; moved to Huntsville, Alabama.)

Timeline

Kelly Cup playoff format
For the 2012–13 season, eight teams still qualify in the Eastern Conference: the three division winners plus the next five teams in the conference. With the addition of the expansion franchise in San Francisco, the Board of Governors changed the Western Conference seeding such that eight teams qualify: two division winners and the next six teams in the conference. This eliminated the Western Conference first-round bye.

Similar to the NHL at the time, the division winners were seeded as the top three seeds in the Eastern Conference and the top two seeds in the Western Conference; the conference winner faced the eighth seed, second faces seventh, third faces sixth and fourth faces fifth in the conference quarterfinal round. The winner of the 1st/8th series played the winner of the 4th/5th series while the 2nd/7th winner played against the 3rd/6th winner in the conference semifinal series. The Board of Governors also elected to change the playoff format such that all rounds of the playoffs are now best of seven series. For 2012–13, the Conference Finals and Kelly Cup Finals will use a two-referee system.

Because of the late addition of the CHL teams for the 2014–15 season and its subsequent conference alignment, the top four teams in each division qualified for the playoffs and the first two playoff rounds were played within the divisions.

For the realignment prior to the 2015–16 season, the playoffs changed once again to a six-division format. At the end of the regular season, the top team in each division qualified for the playoffs and be seeded either 1, 2, or 3 based on the highest point total earned in the season. Then the five non-division winning teams with the highest point totals in each conference qualified for the playoffs and be seeded 4 through 8. All four rounds will be a best-of-seven format.

The alignment changed back to four divisions for the 2016–17 season, but the playoffs kept the divisional format. The top four teams in each division qualify for the playoffs and play in the division for the first two rounds. After the division finals, the winners then play the conference finals and followed by the Kelly Cup finals.

ECHL Hall of Fame 

In celebration of the league's 20th year of play, the ECHL Board of Governors created the ECHL Hall of Fame in 2008, to recognize the achievements of players, coaches, and personnel who dedicated their careers to the league.

See also 
Kelly Cup
ECHL All-Star Game
List of ECHL seasons
List of developmental and minor sports leagues
List of ice hockey leagues

References

External links 

 

 
Minor league ice hockey
Professional ice hockey leagues in Canada
Ice hockey in New Jersey
Organizations based in Princeton, New Jersey
Sports leagues established in 1988
1988 establishments in North America
Professional ice hockey leagues in the United States
Multi-national professional sports leagues
Third tier ice hockey leagues
Multi-national ice hockey leagues in North America